Whittlesea was the original terminus station on the Whittlesea line, located in Victoria,  Australia. It opened in 1889, operating until the closure of the line in 1959.

History
Despite its proximity to Melbourne, the town of Whittlesea had a small population, as did the other settlements served by the line beyond the electrified Melbourne suburban railway system.

The station included a siding which connected to the Kinglake timber tramway.

The freight service to Whittlesea was closed in the mid 1950s, with the passenger service remaining until the line beyond Lalor was closed on 29 November 1959.

The line was partially reopened for suburban electric trains as far Epping in November 1964, with the track beyond removed in 1970. The section from Epping to South Morang was relaid and opened in April 2012, and the section between South Morang and Mernda was reopened in 2018. The rest of the former right-of-way remains in Victorian Government ownership, being classed as parkland.

References 

 

Disused railway stations in Melbourne
Railway stations in Australia opened in 1889